Ștorobăneasa is a commune in the southern part of Teleorman County, Muntenia, Romania, on the left side of the Teleorman River. The commune has 3,101 inhabitants and a surface of  within the built-up area. It is composed of two villages, Beiu and Ștorobăneasa.

Geography
Situated in the Burnasului Plain, in the central part of the Wallachian Plain, Ștorobăneasa Commune shows a uniform and monotonous landscape. The commune is crossed by the Teleorman and Vedea rivers, which meet in Beiu. With a temperate-continental climate the area is characterized through high temperature, low precipitations, and frequent periods of drought.

Ștorobăneasa borders the following communes: Brânceni and Smârdioasa to the west, Mârzănești to the north, Cervenia to the south, and Gogoșari (Giurgiu County) to the east.

Economy
The economic activity of the commune is generally concentrated on agriculture and livestock.

Projects
 Water supply system in Ștorobăneasa.
 Construction of the Ștorobăneasa Kindergarten.

Tourism
Noica Mansion is one of Ștorobăneasa's tourist objectives. Unfortunately, it cannot be visited at this time, as the building is in conservation. It has a long and painful history, the building being vandalized twice: first by the communist authorities after the owners were arrested (later assassinated in jail), and second after being return to its rightful owner, Radu Noica, a German citizen. The building (in a good state in 2005), was vandalized, doors stolen, windows broken, some wall were hammered down. Villagers turned the adjacent land in a garbage dump. It was saved just before the collapse in 2015 by a foreign buyer that recognized its particular architectural style and decided to put in conservation. Its renovation date is still pending, the complicated bureaucratic regime of historical monuments in Romania, its location outside of a major city, as well as the bad will of the local community pushing back the renovation date.

References

Communes in Teleorman County
Localities in Muntenia